Argumental (working title Whose Side Are You On?) is a British improvised comedy panel game hosted originally by John Sergeant and later Sean Lock, alongside two teams captained by Marcus Brigstocke and Rufus Hound, followed by Robert Webb and Seann Walsh, debating and arguing on various topics with help from various guests. It is made by independent production company Tiger Aspect Productions for Dave and made its debut on 27 October 2008. Series three was commissioned for Dave and four episodes from the second series aired on BBC Two, making it UKTV's most successful commission in terms of reach of audience.

Participants
The programme was originally chaired by journalist John Sergeant whose post-journalistic career at the time the series began was on the rise due in part to his appearance on the BBC's Strictly Come Dancing. He was joined by team captains Marcus Brigstocke, the host of The Late Edition, and comedian Rufus Hound. Each team captain was accompanied by a guest panellist who have included Jimmy Carr, Sue Perkins, Reginald D. Hunter, Phill Jupitus, Charlie Higson, Johnny Vegas, Lucy Porter, Dara Ó Briain, Sean Lock and Frankie Boyle. From the 2011 series, Sean Lock replaced John Sergeant as presenter, while Seann Walsh and Robert Webb took over as team captains. This coincided with a revamp of the show's set and graphics.

Format
Each episode comprises a series of rounds in which each team takes its turn debating a variety of topics, whilst also trying to be amusing. Topics have included: 'recycling is a waste of time' and 'the Royal Family serve no purpose'. After each round the team members often make humorous observations about what has just been said, before the studio audience votes for who they thought put forward the best case. Voting is done by holding up a red or blue paddle to vote for the red or blue team respectively. The votes are tallied before the winner of the round is decided.  The team that wins the most rounds wins the show.

Rounds
Each episode normally contains 5 rounds. Sometimes however some episodes contain 4 rounds with 1 round dropped altogether.

Classic debate
A representative from each team takes their turn to argue for or against a given motion, respectively. After the main arguments have been put forward the teams are invited to discuss the subject further to reinforce their team's argument or attack their opponent's.

Visual aids
Team members try to argue over a topic while incorporating pictures from a slideshow that they have never seen before into their case.

Flip-flop
Each team is given a different topic to argue about in this round. The team representative must argue for the motion until a buzzer sounds at which point they must argue against the motion. The contestant continues to alternate between for and against until the end of round buzzer is sounded. This round does not appear in every episode.

That's a Brilliant Idea
Introduced in series 3, representatives from each team take turns being given a typically nonsensical, illogical or outrageous statement, and have to argue a convincing case for that statement being a good thing, starting each argument with the words "That's a brilliant idea.".

Popular culture round
In series 1, this round was similar to the 'classic debate' round except the topic involves a famous person or celebrity. The person being debated was represented by a life sized cut-out placed in the centre of the performance stage. Past celebrities have included Piers Morgan, Victoria Beckham, Amy Winehouse, Wayne and Coleen Rooney, Simon Cowell and Jeremy Kyle.

Since series 2, this round has not always featured cardboard cut-outs; in some episodes, real-life people (e.g. a body builder) come on stage instead.

Final picture round
This round doesn't involve any arguing per person, alternatively contestants are shown pictures for which they must invent a motion to suit. Unlike the other rounds, both teams remain seated throughout. Like the flip-flop round, this round has not always been included.  The audience still votes red or blue.

Guest appearances
The following appeared on the show as a guest.

6 appearances
Jimmy Carr
Sean Lock
Mark Watson

4 appearances
Frankie Boyle
Phill Jupitus

3 appearances
Chris Addison
Stephen K. Amos
Katy Brand
Richard Herring
Andrew Maxwell
Dara Ó Briain
Lucy Porter
Jack Whitehall

2 appearances
Hugh Dennis
Charlie Higson
Sean Hughes
Stephen Mangan
Sarah Millican
Ardal O'Hanlon
Sue Perkins
Will Smith
Johnny Vegas

1 appearance
Jo Brand
Ed Byrne
Jason Byrne
Jo Caulfield
Jarred Christmas
Simon Day
Micky Flanagan
Reginald D. Hunter
Robin Ince
Dom Joly
Miles Jupp
Russell Kane
Patrick Kielty
Jason Manford
Rory McGrath
Ben Miller
Andy Parsons
Chris Ramsey
Daniel Sloss
Tim Vine

a.  Appearances made before becoming the host.

Transmissions

Original series

Specials

References

External links
Argumental at Dave

2008 British television series debuts
2012 British television series endings
2000s British game shows
2010s British game shows
2000s British satirical television series
2010s British satirical television series
British panel games
Dave (TV channel) original programming
English-language television shows
Television series by Banijay
Television series by Tiger Aspect Productions